Sujeet Parbatani (born 11 October 1995) is an Indian cricketer. He made his List A debut for Cricket Coaching School in the 2013–14 Dhaka Premier Division Cricket League on 17 September 2013.  He also played for Sheikh Jamal Dhanmondi Club in the Dhaka Premier Division Cricket League. In January 2021, he was named in the Northern Warriors' squad for the 2021 T10 League.

References

External links
 

1995 births
Living people
Indian cricketers
Cricket Coaching School cricketers
Cricketers from Hyderabad, India